Quiéreme porque me muero ("Love Me Because I Die") is a 1953 Mexican film directed by Chano Urueta and produced by Julio Valdovinos.

Cast

 Abel Salazar
 Martha Roth
 Andrés Soler
 Arturo Martínez
 Roberto Meyer
 Nacho Contla
 Amparo Arozamena				
 Josefina Leiner		
 Francisco Pando		
 Camilo Pérez 'Bulldog'

		 (as Camilo Perez 'Bull Dog')

References

External links
 

1953 films
1950s Spanish-language films
Films directed by Chano Urueta
Mexican black-and-white films
Mexican romantic comedy films
1953 romantic comedy films
1950s Mexican films